Brokedown Palace is a 1999 American drama film by Jonathan Kaplan.

Brokedown Palace may also refer to:
 Brokedown Palace (novel), a novel by Steven Brust
 Brokedown Palace: Music from the Original Motion Picture Soundtrack
 "Brokedown Palace", a song by the Grateful Dead from American Beauty